The second Howard ministry (Liberal–National coalition) was the 61st ministry of the Government of Australia. It was led by the country's 25th prime minister, John Howard. The second Howard ministry succeeded the first Howard ministry, which dissolved on 21 October 1998 following the federal election that took place on 3 October. The ministry was replaced by the third Howard ministry on 10 November 2001 following the 2001 federal election.

Cabinet

Outer ministry

Parliamentary Secretaries

See also
 First Howard ministry
 Third Howard ministry
 Fourth Howard ministry

Notes

Ministries of Elizabeth II
Howard, 2
1990s in Australia
1998 establishments in Australia
2001 disestablishments in Australia
Cabinets established in 1998
Cabinets disestablished in 2001
Howard Government